Yele Omogunwa (born may 22 1950) is a Nigerian Politician and was the Senator representing Ondo South Senatorial District of Ondo State at the 8th National Assembly. He was defeated in the 2019 senatorial election by Nicholas Tofowomo of the People's Democratic Party (PDP) for the Ondo south senatorial seat

References

External links
 Profile at Biographical Legacy and Research Foundation

1950 births
Living people
Politicians from Ondo State
All Progressives Congress politicians
Members of the Senate (Nigeria)
21st-century Nigerian politicians
20th-century Nigerian politicians
Members of the House of Representatives (Nigeria)
Obafemi Awolowo University alumni